Hidde Turkstra (born 5 March 1988) is a Dutch former field hockey player who played as a defender for the Dutch national team.

He participated at the 2016 Summer Olympics. and he played club hockey in the Netherlands for Rotterdam and Victoria.

Club career
Turkstra started playing hockey at Rotterdam and in 2005 he switched to Victoria. Where he made his debut in the senior team. In 2009 he returned to Rotterdam, where he played for ten seasons until he retired in 2019.

International career
Turkstra made his debut for the national team on 5 June 2013. He was a part of the Dutch squad which won the 2015 European Championship. After he played in the 2016 Summer Olympics he announced his retirement from the national team.

References

External links

1988 births
Living people
Sportspeople from Rotterdam
Dutch male field hockey players
Male field hockey defenders
Field hockey players at the 2016 Summer Olympics
Olympic field hockey players of the Netherlands
HC Rotterdam players